Alfonso de Aloysio (1644–1694) was a Roman Catholic prelate who served as Bishop of Squillace (1688–1694).

Biography
Alfonso de Aloysio was born in Montelparo, Italy on 4 January 1644 and ordained a priest on 3 May 1678.
On 31 May 1688, he was appointed during the papacy of Pope Innocent XI as Bishop of Squillace.
On 13 June 1688, he was consecrated bishop by Fabrizio Spada, Cardinal-Priest of San Callisto with Pier Antonio Capobianco, Bishop Emeritus of Lacedonia, and Costanzo Zani, Bishop of Imola, serving as co-consecrators. 
He served as Bishop of Squillace until his death in May 1694.

References

External links and additional sources
 (for Chronology of Bishops) 
 (for Chronology of Bishops) 

17th-century Italian Roman Catholic bishops
Bishops appointed by Pope Innocent XI
1644 births
1694 deaths